Giuseppe Rottario or 'Giuseppe Roverio (1657–1720) was a Roman Catholic prelate who served as Bishop of Alba (1697–1720).

Biography
Giuseppe Rottario was born om 25 Sep 1657 in Vicia, Italy and ordained a priest on 23 Mar 1681.
On 27 Mar 1697, he was appointed during the papacy of Pope Innocent XII as Bishop of Alba.
On 8 Apr 1697, he was consecrated bishop by Domenico Maria Corsi, Bishop of Rimini, with Carlo Loffredo, Archbishop of Bari, and Miguel Antonio de Benavides y Piedrola, Bishop of Cartagena, serving as co-consecrators. 
He served as Bishop of Alba until his death on 4 Nov 1720.

References

External links and additional sources
 (for Chronology of Bishops) 
 (for Chronology of Bishops) 

17th-century Italian Roman Catholic bishops
Bishops appointed by Pope Innocent XII
1657 births
1720 deaths